The Subprefecture of Cidade Tiradentes is one of 32 subprefectures of the city of São Paulo, Brazil.  It comprises one district: Cidade Tiradentes.

References

Subprefectures of São Paulo